Love, Honour and Obey is a 2000 mock gangster film starring several members of the Primrose Hill set. It was jointly written and directed by Dominic Anciano and Ray Burdis (who also appear in the film) as a follow-up to their 1998 film Final Cut. As with Final Cut, most of the characters have the same  name as the actors who play them. The film also features a cameo appearance from former East London boxer turned comedian, Ricky Grover.

Synopsis
Jonny (Jonny Lee Miller) is working as a courier and becoming increasingly dissatisfied with his life. He asks long-running school friend Jude (Jude Law) to help him into the North London criminal gang run by his uncle Ray (Ray Winstone). As Jonny gets more involved in the image of the criminal world, he starts making mistakes and through a mutual dislike for rival gangster Matthew (Rhys Ifans) inadvertently starts a war with the South London mob, headed up by Sean (Sean Pertwee).

Cast
 Sadie Frost as Sadie
 Jonny Lee Miller as Jonny
 Jude Law as Jude
 Ray Winstone as Ray Kreed
 Kathy Burke as Kathy
 Sean Pertwee as Sean
 Denise Van Outen as Maureen
 Rhys Ifans as Matthew
 Dominic Anciano as Dominic
 Ray Burdis as Ray
 John Beckett as John
 Trevor Laird as Trevor (credited as Trevor H. Laird)
 William Scully as Bill (credited as William Scully Q.G.M.)
 Perry Benson as Perry 'Fat Alan'
 Mark Burdis as Mark
 Laila Morse as Laila

References

External links

2000 films
Films set in London
British crime drama films
British gangster films
Films shot in London
2000 drama films
2001 drama films
2001 films
2000s English-language films
2000s British films